The 1973–74 South Pacific cyclone season was an inactive season. In tropical cyclones, it was an average season, but in strength, it was very inactive, with only two severe tropical cyclones.

Systems

Tropical Cyclone SP7301

Severe Tropical Cyclone Natalie–Lottie

This storm initally formed as Natalie, then moved into the Australian region on the same day. Later, it moved back into the South Pacific and was renamed Lottie.  High seas caused the ship Uluilakeba to capsize killing more than 85 people. This makes Lottie one of the deadliest tropical cyclones in region in recent decades.

Tropical Cyclone Monica

Tropical Cyclone Nessie

Tropical Cyclone Vera

Severe Tropical Cyclone Pam

Tropical Cyclone Rebecca

Rebecca was thought to have had a complex evolution with two low-level circulation centres.

Tropical Cyclone Zoe

Tropical Cyclone Alice

Tropical Cyclone Tina

Seasonal effects 

|-
| SP7301 ||  || bgcolor=#|Category 1 tropical cyclone || bgcolor=#| || bgcolor=#| || || || ||
|-
| Natalie-Lottie ||  || bgcolor=#|Category 3 severe tropical cyclone || bgcolor=#| || bgcolor=#| || || || ||
|-
| Monica ||  || bgcolor=#|Category 1 tropical cyclone || bgcolor=#| || bgcolor=#| || || || ||
|-
| Nessie ||  || bgcolor=#|Category 1 tropical cyclone || bgcolor=#| || bgcolor=#| || || || ||
|-
| Vera ||  ||  bgcolor=#|Category 2 tropical cyclone || bgcolor=#| || bgcolor=#| || || || ||
|-
| Pam ||  || bgcolor=#|Category 4 severe tropical cyclone || bgcolor=#| || bgcolor=#| || || || ||
|-
| Rebecca ||  || bgcolor=#| || bgcolor=#| || bgcolor=#| || || || ||
|-
| Zoe ||  || bgcolor=#|Category 2 tropical cyclone || bgcolor=#| || bgcolor=#| || || || ||
|-
| Alice ||  || bgcolor=#|Category 2 tropical cyclone || bgcolor=#| || bgcolor=#| || || || ||
|-
| Tina ||  || bgcolor=#|Category 2 tropical cyclone || bgcolor=#| || bgcolor=#| ||  || || ||
|-

See also

Atlantic hurricane seasons: 1973, 1974
Eastern Pacific hurricane seasons: 1973, 1974
Western Pacific typhoon seasons: 1973, 1974
North Indian Ocean cyclone seasons: 1973, 1974

References

External links

 
South Pacific cyclone seasons
Articles which contain graphical timelines